From the foundation of the American Association (AA) in 1902 through its final season in 1997, its pitchers threw 97 no-hitters, which include 6 perfect games. Of these no-hitters, 72 were pitched in games that lasted at least the full 9 innings, while 25 were pitched in games shortened due to weather or that were played in doubleheaders, which were typically 7 innings. Only three of the league's six perfect games were tossed in full nine-inning games. Five no-hitters were combined—thrown by two or more pitchers on the same team.

A no-hit game occurs when a pitcher (or pitchers) allows no hits during the entire course of a game. A batter may still reach base via a walk, an error, a fielder's choice, a hit by pitch, a passed ball or wild pitch on strike three, or catcher's interference. Due to these methods of reaching base, it is possible for a team to score runs without getting any hits. While the vast majority of no-hitters are shutouts, teams which went hitless have managed to score runs in their respective games 11 times in AA games, some in extra innings.

The first American Association no-hitter was thrown on August 10, 1906, by Harry Swan of the Kansas City Blues against the Columbus Senators at Neil Park in Columbus, Ohio. The first perfect game was pitched on May 26, 1940, by Mickey Haefner of the Minneapolis Millers versus the Milwaukee Brewers at Nicollet Park in Minneapolis, Minnesota, in a game that was called after six innings due to a six o'clock Sunday amusement blue law. The first nine-inning perfect game occurred on June 26, 1947, when Kansas City's Carl DeRose accomplished the feat against Minneapolis at Municipal Stadium in Kansas City, Missouri. The league disbanded after the 1962 season but reorganized in 1969. It continued to operate through the 1997 season. The final AA no-hitter was thrown on June 20, 1997, by Bartolo Colón of the Buffalo Bisons over the New Orleans Zephyrs at North AmeriCare Park in Buffalo, New York.

Two league pitchers have thrown multiple no-hitters. Charley Hall pitched three no-hit games for the St. Paul Saints (formerly the Apostles), giving him the record for the most career AA no-hitters. The first was a 12-inning affair, which he lost, in 1909. He won the second two 9-inning games in 1918 and 1920. Chris Knapp threw his first no-hitter in 1979 for the Iowa Oaks and pitched the opening four innings of a combined no-hitter for Iowa in 1977. 

The teams with the most no-hitters are the Toledo Mud Hens (10 no-hitters, 1 a perfect game) and Indianapolis Indians (10 no-hitters). They are followed by the Kansas City Blues (8 no-hitters, 1 a perfect game) and the Louisville Colonels and St. Paul Saints (8 no-hitters each). The team with the most perfect games is the Oklahoma City 89ers, with two.

No-hitters

No-hitters by team

See also
List of International League no-hitters
List of Pacific Coast League no-hitters

Notes

References
Specific

General

No-hitters
American Association (1902-1997) no-hitters